David William Concar is a British diplomat. Concar was Deputy Editor of New Scientist magazine from 1996 until 2004 when he joined the FCDO. From 2004 to 2012, he held many Beijing related positions such as First Secretary, Science & Innovation Counsellor, Climate Change & Energy Counsellor and Prosperity Counsellor. From 2012 to 2014, he was FCDO's Head of Climate Change & Energy and from 2014 to 2016 he was FCDO's Head of International Organisations and Commonwealth Envoy. He was the British Ambassador to Somalia from January 2017 until February 2019 and has been the British High Commissioner to Tanzania since August 2020.

References 

Living people
Ambassadors of the United Kingdom to Somalia
High Commissioners of the United Kingdom to Tanzania
Year of birth missing (living people)